Nadezhda Paleeva (also transliterated Paleyeva, born 24 September 1985) is a Russian bobsledder.

Paleeva competed at the 2014 Winter Olympics for Russia. She teamed with Nadezhda Sergeeva as the Russia-2 sled in the two-woman event, finishing 16th.

Paleeva made her World Cup debut in December 2013. As of April 2014, her best World Cup finish is 6th, at Igls in 2013-14.

References

External links
 
 
 

1985 births
Living people
Russian female bobsledders
Olympic bobsledders of Russia
Sportspeople from Omsk
Bobsledders at the 2014 Winter Olympics